Reykjavík Whale Watching massacre or RWWM is an Icelandic 2009 horror film.

Plot 
A tale about a group of tourists who go on whale watching expedition. During the expedition the ship breaks down and they are picked up by a nearby whaler. The Fishbillies on the vessel have just gone bust and everything goes out of control.

Cast 
 Pihla Viitala as Annette
 Nae as Endo
 Terence Anderson as Leon
 Miranda Hennessy as Marie-Anne
 Helgi Björnsson as Tryggvi
 Guðrún Gísladóttir as Mamma
 Stefán Jónsson as Siggi
 Aymen Hamdouchi as Jean Francois
 Snorri Engilbertsson as Anton
 Gunnar Hansen as Captain Pétur
 Thor Kristjansson as Björn
 Ragnhildur Steinunn Jónsdóttir as Hannah Traschle
 Carlos Takeshi as Nobuyoshi
 Halldóra Geirharðsdóttir as Helga
 Hanna María Karlsdóttir as Signý
 Björn Nygårds Kers as Captured Bird Watcher

Release
The film was released in theaters in its native country of Iceland in September. Due to the lack of horror films and the grindhouse feel to the film, many audience members could not take it seriously, not noticing the subtle hints of comedy throughout the movie. Advertisements, which started with the words "The first Icelandic Thriller" were removed and the producers added in "Should only be seen if you have a sense of humor." E1 Entertainment have picked up UK rights for theatrical distribution and was released on 10 May 2010. The film ran in the UK as Harpoon: The Reykjavik Whale Watching Massacre.

Background
 Horror movie fans may recognize Icelandic-born actor Gunnar Hansen, who played Leatherface in the original The Texas Chain Saw Massacre.

References

External links 
 
 Official Facebook
 Official MySpace

2009 films
2009 horror films
English-language Icelandic films
Films about vacationing
2000s Icelandic-language films
Seafaring films
2000s survival films
2000s English-language films
Icelandic horror films